Huawei LiteOS was a lightweight real-time operating system (RTOS) developed by Huawei. It is an open source, POSIX compliant operating system for Internet of things (IoT) devices, released under a three-clause BSD license. Microcontrollers of different architectures such as ARM (M0/3/4/7, A7/17/53, ARM9/11), x86, and RISC-V are supported by the project.  Huawei LiteOS is part of Huawei's '1+8+N' Internet of Things solution, and has been featured in a number of open source development kits and industry offerings.

Smartwatches by Huawei and its former Honor brand run LiteOS. LiteOS has since been incorporated into the IoT-oriented HarmonyOS with open source OpenHarmony.

History
On 20 May 2015, at the Huawei Network Conference, Huawei proposed the '1+2+1' Internet of Things solution and release the IoT operating system named Huawei LiteOS.

Key features
Lightweight, small kernel; <10 kilobytes (kB)
Energy efficient
Fast startup within milliseconds
Support NB-IoT, Wi-Fi, Ethernet, BLE, Zigbee, and other different IoT protocols
Support access to different cloud platforms

Supported architectures

ADI
ADuCM4050
Atmel
Atmel SAM D21 Xplained Pro
ATSAM4S-XPRO
ARDUINO ZERO PRO
GigaDevice
GD32F450I-EVAL
GD32F190R-EVAL
GD32F103C-EVAL
GD32F150R-EVAL
GD32F207C-EVAL
GD32VF103
Huawei
Hi3518
Kirin A1
MediaTek
LINKIT7687HDK
Microchip
ATSAME70Q21
MindMotion
MM32F103_MINI
MM32L373
MM32L073PF
Nuvoton
Nordic Semi
NRF52840-PDK
NRF52-DK
NXP
LPC824_LITE
LPC54110_BOARD
FRDM-KW41Z
FRDM-KL25Z
Silicon Labs
EFM32 GIANT GECKO STARTER KIT EFM32GG-STK3700
EFM32 PEARL GECKO STARTER KIT SLSTK3401A
EFM32 HAPPY GECKO STARTER KIT SLSTK3400A
STMicroelectronics
STM32F411RE-NUCLEO
STM32F412ZG-NUCLEO
STM32F429I_DISCO
STM32L476RG_NUCLEO
STM32F746ZG_NUCLEO
STM32F103RB-NUCLEO
TI
LAUNCHXL-CC3220SF

See also

Embedded operating system
HarmonyOS
OpenHarmony
WearOS

References

External links

2015 software
Embedded operating systems
Free software operating systems
Lightweight Unix-like systems
Real-time operating systems
Software using the BSD license
Wireless sensor network
Unix variants